The 2014–15 French Guiana Division d'Honneur, the highest tier in men's football in French Guiana, was won by CSC de Cayenne.

League table 
Note that the point system in French Guiana is 4/win, 2/draw, 1/loss.

Kourou FC were ranked last for failing to maintain enough youth teams.

NB: The table shows 4 more losses than wins and an overall goal difference of -11, due to award of matches between Grand Santi and Matoury in round 14 and Kourou FC and Sinnamary in round 19.

References 

 

2014–15
2014–15 in Caribbean football leagues
1